The 1970 Humboldt State Lumberjacks football team represented the Humboldt State College—now known as California State Polytechnic University, Humboldt—as a member of the Far Western Conference (FWC) during the 1970 NCAA College Division football season. Led by fifth-year head coach Bud Van Deren, Humboldt State compiled an overall record of 5–5 with a mark of 2–2 in conference play, tying for third place in the FWC. For the season the team was outscored by its opponents 266 to 238. The Lumberjacks played home games at the Redwood Bowl in Arcata, California.

Tackle Len Gotshalk received third-team honors on the 1970 Little All-America college football team.

Schedule

Team players in the NFL
The following Humboldt State players were selected in the 1971 NFL Draft.

References

Humboldt State
Humboldt State Lumberjacks football seasons
Humboldt State Lumberjacks football